Jasper County Airport may refer to:

 Jasper County Airport (Indiana) in Rensselaer, Indiana, United States (FAA: RZL, IATA: RNZ)
 Jasper County Airport (Texas) in Jasper, Texas, United States (FAA/IATA: JAS)